Nadia Drake is an American science journalist and contributing writer at National Geographic.

Early life and education 
By 2002 Drake had earned an A.B. in biology, psychology, and dance at Cornell University,

She returned to Cornell for her Ph.D. in genetics and developmental biology in 2009. Her Ph.D. thesis is entitled Phenotypic consequences of imprinting perturbations at Rasgrf1 in mouse.

In 2011 she graduated from the University of California's Science Communication program at the Santa Cruz campus, with a Master of Science degree.

Career 
Drake worked in a clinical genetics lab at The Johns Hopkins University School of Medicine while she was studying her Ph.D. in Genetics.

During her residence at the UCSC's SciCom program, she was a reporting intern for the Santa Cruz Sentinel, San Jose's The Mercury News, and Nature.

Afterwards she moved to Washington, D.C. for an internship at Science News, which turned into a job as the magazine's astronomy reporter.

Drake then returned to the San Francisco Bay Area for a science reporting job at WIRED.

She is now a freelance contributor to The Proceedings of the National Academy of Sciences, WIRED, and other publications, in addition to her regular column at National Geographic.

Book 
Drake is the author of Little Book of Wonders: Celebrating the Gifts of the Natural World (National Geographic Books, 2016).

Awards and honours 

 In 2016 Drake received the Jonathan Eberhart Planetary Sciences Journalism Award for her article "Scientists in Flying Telescope Race to Intercept Pluto's Shadow," which appeared July 3, 2015, on National Geographic's website.
 In 2017 she won the David N. Schramm Award for High Energy Astrophysics Science Journalism from the High Energy Astrophysics Division of the American Astronomical Society for "Found! Gravitational Waves, or a Wrinkle in Spacetime" which was published on National Geographic's website on February 11, 2016.

Personal life 
Drake is daughter of SETI's pioneer Frank Drake  and Amahl Drake (née Shakhashiri).

References

External links

No Place Like Home
Nadia Drake on Twitter

1980 births
Living people
University of California, Santa Cruz alumni
Science journalists
Cornell University alumni
American science writers
Science bloggers
American women bloggers
American bloggers
Women science writers
American women non-fiction writers
21st-century American non-fiction writers
21st-century American women writers